Trachylepidia fructicassiella is a moth of the family Pyralidae first described by Émile Louis Ragonot in 1887. It is found in India, Pakistan and Sri Lanka.

The wingspan of the adult is 20–32 mm. Dorsum dusky brown and ventrum light brown. Proboscis short almost concealed. Apical margin of forewings crenulated with apical angle sub-rounded. Apical margin of hindwings slightly sinuated, with apical angle sub-rounded. Anterior and posterior margin of both wings are convex.

The caterpillar is a pest on pods of Cassia roxburghii and Cassia fistula. Parasierola species are known parasitoids of these caterpillars.

References

External links
Pods and Seeds Characteristics Within a Pod Crop of an Amaltas Tree (Cassia fistula L. – Caesalpiniaceae): I. Insect Infestation, Number of Seeds Per Pod and the Packaging Cost

Moths of Asia
Moths described in 1887